Touria Alaoui (born September 21, 1970 in Ouarzazate) is a Moroccan actress. She is married to actor Naoufel Berraoui.

Partial filmography

Feature films 

 L'enfance volée (1993) 
 Tarfaya (2004) 
 Youm ou Lila (2013)

Short films 

 Liberté provisoire (2007) 
 Margelle (2012) 
 De l'eau et du sang (2014)

References

External links 
 

1970 births
Living people
Moroccan film actresses